This is a list of streets in Los Angeles, California. They are grouped by type: arterial thoroughfares, commercial corridors, and other streets.

Arterial thoroughfares
Major east–west routes
 Adams Boulevard
 Beverly Boulevard
 Century Boulevard
 Exposition Boulevard
 Hollywood Boulevard
 Jefferson Boulevard
 Martin Luther King Jr. Boulevard 
 Obama Boulevard
 Olympic Boulevard
 Pico Boulevard
 Roscoe Boulevard
 Santa Monica Boulevard
 Sunset Boulevard
 Venice Boulevard
 Ventura Boulevard
 Victory Boulevard
 Washington Boulevard
 Wilshire Boulevard

Major north–south routes
 Avalon Boulevard
 Beverly Glen Boulevard
 Crenshaw Boulevard
 Glendale Boulevard
 La Cienega Boulevard
 Laurel Canyon Boulevard
 Lincoln Boulevard
 Main Street
 Reseda Boulevard
 Robertson Boulevard
 San Vicente Boulevard
 Sepulveda Boulevard
 Topanga Canyon Boulevard
 Van Nuys Boulevard
 Westwood Boulevard

Commercial corridors
  Pacific Coast Highway/Lincoln Boulevard
  Santa Monica Boulevard
  Decker Canyon Road
  Topanga Canyon Boulevard
  Alameda Street
  Slauson Avenue
  Highland Avenue
  Venice Boulevard

Other streets
 Alameda Street
 Avenue of the Stars
 Broadway
 Bundy Drive
 Centinela Avenue
 Central Avenue
 Cesar Chavez Avenue
 Fairfax Avenue
 Figueroa Street
 Florence Avenue
 Fountain Avenue
 Grand Avenue
 Highland Avenue
 Huntington Drive
 Imperial Highway
 La Brea Avenue
 Manchester Avenue
 Melrose Avenue
 Mission Road
 Mulholland Drive
 Normandie Avenue
 Pacific Coast Highway
 Slauson Avenue
 Spring Street
 Vermont Avenue
 Western Avenue

Alleyways
 Olvera Street
 Santee Alley

See also 

 List of Los Angeles placename etymologies
 Transportation in Los Angeles
 Pico and Sepulveda
 Los Angeles streets, 1–10
 Los Angeles streets, 11–40
 Los Angeles streets, 41–250
 Los Angeles Avenues
 List of streets in the San Gabriel Valley

External links

References

 
Los Angeles-related lists
Los Angeles